Tao Pun (also spelled Tao Poon) is a neighbourhood in Bangkok's Bang Sue district. It is so named after the country's first cement factory, established in 1913 by the Siam Cement Company, whose corporate headquarters are still located here, adjacent Bang Sue Junction railway station on its west side. Today, the name most specifically refers to the area around Tao Pun Junction, where Krung Thep–Nonthaburi Road meets Pracharat Sai Song Road beneath the elevated Tao Poon MRT station, which connects the Blue Line and Purple Line.

References

Neighbourhoods of Bangkok
Bang Sue district